James H. "Jimmy" Butwell (c. 1892–1956) was an American Racing Hall of Fame jockey. His birth year placed at the Family Search.org website is stated as 1896. However, although there were no child labor laws in the United States, it seems unlikely that he would have been a professional jockey at age twelve.
A Michigan native, before his successful time riding in the New York City area, Jimmy Butwell began his career at small race tracks in Nebraska and Colorado. Butwell rode for several prominent owners and in 1912, a year he led all North American riders in earnings, he rode Monocacy to victory for Harry Payne Whitney in  the Victoria Stakes at Woodbine Racetrack in Toronto, Ontario, Canada. Of his four mounts in the Kentucky Derby, Butwell's best finish was third in the 1915 running. He won the 1913 Preakness Stakes and captured the 1910 Belmont Stakes and the 1917 Belmont Stakes. In 1920 Butwell had more race wins than any jockey in the United States and the following year rode Herendesy to victory in Canada's most prestigious race, the King's Plate.

Jimmy Butwell retired after riding in the 1928 season, then worked as a racing official. Living in Florida, he was working at Gulfstream Park when he died in 1956. He was inducted in the United States' Racing Hall of Fame in 1984.

References

American jockeys
American Champion jockeys
United States Thoroughbred Racing Hall of Fame inductees
Sportspeople from Michigan
Year of birth missing
1956 deaths